Athamantis (minor planet designation: 230 Athamantis) is a fairly large main-belt asteroid that was discovered by the German-Austrian astronomer K. de Ball on September 3, 1882, in Bothkamp. It was his only asteroid discovery. The asteroid was named after Athamantis, daughter of Athamas the mythical Greek king of Orchomenus.

Photometric observations of this asteroid gave a light curve with a period of 23.99 hours and a brightness variation of more than 0.20 in magnitude. It has the spectrum of an S-type asteroid. During 1991, the asteroid was observed occulting a star. The resulting chords provided a cross-section diameter estimate of 101.8 km.

References

External links
 The Asteroid Orbital Elements Database
 Minor Planet Discovery Circumstances
 Asteroid Lightcurve Data File
 
 

Background asteroids
Athamantis
Athamantis
S-type asteroids (Tholen)
Sl-type asteroids (SMASS)
18820903
Objects observed by stellar occultation